Herbert Reginald McClure, (23 March 1883 – 1 January 1925) was a British Colonial Service administrator.
He joined the Royal Navy and was appointed as Acting Sub-Lieutenant on 15 January 1898.  He trained as an officer cadet at Britannia Royal Naval College, Dartmouth, when the wooden hulk HMS Britannia  was the barracks. He passing out following examinations in April, 1899.

He joined the Colonial Service. He was appointed as the District Commissioner of Nyeri in Kenya in 1914. He was appointed as officer in charge of the Masai Reserve in Kenya in 1920.
He was appointed Resident Commissioner of the Gilbert and Ellice Islands Colony in February 1922. He died in Sydney, Australian on 1 January 1925 while staying at the Wentworth Hotel.

Selected works

References

1883 births
1925 deaths
Governors of the Gilbert and Ellice Islands
British people in British Kenya